Saint John Mountain is a mountain located in the Northern Coast Ranges of California. It is located just to the north of Snow Mountain in the Mendocino National Forest.
The peak is high enough to receive snowfall in winter.

References

Mountains of Glenn County, California
Mountains of Northern California